Carrière may refer to:

 Calvin Carrière (1921–2002), U.S. fiddler
 Élie-Abel Carrière  (1818–1896), French botanist
 Eric Carrière (born 1973), French footballer
 Eugène Carrière (1849–1906), French lithographer and painter
 Eva Carrière (1886–?), French spiritualist
 Jean-Claude Carrière (born 1931), French screenwriter and actor
 Joseph Carrière (1795–1864), French theologian
 Joseph Médard Carrière (1902–1970), Canadian folklorist
 Keumhee Chough Carrière, Korean-Canadian statistician
 Larry Carriere (born 1952), Canadian ice hockey player
 Louis-Chrétien Carrière, Baron de Beaumont (1771–1813), French cavalry general
 Mathieu Carrière (born 1950), German actor
 Moritz Carrière (1817–1895), German philosopher and historian
 Serge Carrière, a medical researcher

The Anglicized version, Carriere, may refer to:
 Elizabeth Carriere, Governor of Montserrat from 2015 to 2018
 Jeromy Carriere, American architect
 Stephen Carriere (born 1989), American figure skater